NAMP may refer to:

 North American Meat Processors Association, a non-profit industry group for meat processors, packers, and distributors, established in 1942 and merged into the North American Meat Institute in 2015
 North American Mycoflora Project, a non-profit citizen-science organization established in 2017, now known as Fungal Diversity Survey (FunDiS)

See also
 NAMPS, a narrowband version of the Advanced Mobile Phone System developed by Bell Labs and Motorola